The following is a list of Switzerland women's national rugby union team matches.

Overall 

Switzerland's overall international match record against all nations is as follows:

Full internationals

2010s

2020s

Other matches

References 

Switzerland